Stieber is a surname. Notable people with the surname include:

András Stieber (born 1991), Hungarian footballer
Logan Stieber (born 1991), American amateur wrestler
Mercédesz Stieber (born 1974), Hungarian water polo player 
Sarolta Stieber (1905–1985), Hungarian swimmer
Tamar Stieber, American journalist
Wilhelm Stieber (1818-1882), Prussian spy
Zoltán Stieber (born 1988), Hungarian footballer